Mount Taungnyo is the mountain of the Tenasserim Range. It is located in Kayin State, Burma, close to the border with Thailand. 

The highest point nearby is Sedaung Taung 1,269 meters above sea level, 26.2 km west of Taungnyo Taung. The following mountains are in the Taungnyo Taung parts:

 Kaleiktok Taung
 Lepalaw Taung
 Mezali Taung
 Sedaung Taung

The temperature promo 21°C. The warmest moon is April, at 25°C, and the coldest month is August, at 12 ° C.The rain promises 3321 millimeter every year. The hottest months are August, at 677 millimeter every year. The highest moon is August, in the 677 millimeter in the rain, and the driest moon is December, in the 6 millimeter in the rain.

See also
List of mountains in Burma

References

External links

"Viewfinder Panoramas Digital elevation Model" (2015-6-21).
"Taungnyo Taung" said"Geonames.org (cc-by)" Geonames.org; mail updated 2016-06-01; database download downloaded 2016-10-22
"NASA Earth Observations: Population Density NASA/SEDAO
"NASA Earth Observations: Land Cover Classification" NASA/MODES
Peel, M C; Finlayson, B L."Updated world map of the Köppen-Geiger climate classification " Hydrology and Earth System Sciences 11: p. 1633–1644.
"NASA Earth Observations Data set Index NASA
"NASA Earth Observations: Rainfall (1 month-TRMM) NASA/Tropical Rainfall Monitoring Mission
Peakbagger Taungnyo Taung, Myanmar.

Kayin State
Taungnyo